Pearl Rivers (pen name of Eliza Jane Nicholson; formerly Holbrook; née Poitevent; March 11, 1843 – February 15, 1896) was an American journalist and poet, and the first female editor of a major American newspaper. After being the literary editor of the New Orleans Times Picayune, Rivers became the owner  and publisher in 1876 when her elderly husband died. In 1880, she took over as managing editor, where she continued until her death in 1896.

She took the name from the Pearl River, which was located near her home in Mississippi. She did not let traditional norms hold her back from doing what she wished, and most of her newspaper work was pursued against the wishes of her family and society.

Early life and education
Eliza Jane Poitevent was born in Gainesville, Hancock, Mississippi, USA, on March 11, 1843 (some sources say 1849). She was the third child of a prosperous family of five, with a busy father and a sickly mother. She is listed on the 1850 U.S. Census as living in Beat 2 of Hancock County, Mississippi, with an age of seven and younger siblings in the household.

When she was nine years old, she moved to her aunt Jane's house in the vicinity of today's Picayune, Mississippi. Her uncle Leonard Kimball managed a plantation, a store, and a toll bridge there. She was sent to the Amite Female Seminary in Liberty, Mississippi, graduating in 1859, where she earned (or gave herself) the title of the "wildest girl in school".

Rivers' first romance was with a young man she had met while at the seminary, but this was suppressed by the headmaster and her uncle. During the American Civil War (1861–1865) she may have fallen in love with a soldier, since such a romance was described in a group of poems she wrote in 1866 for the New Orleans Times.

Career
After the war, she began submitting her work to newspapers and magazines under the pseudonym "Pearl Rivers", and her poems were published in the New Orleans literary sheet, The South, and in the New York Home Journal and the New York Ledger. On 17 October 1866 the New Orleans daily The Picayune published her poem "A Little Bunch of Roses", the first of her work known to have been published in that paper, and after 1867 all her work was published in this paper.

During one of Rivers' visits to her grandfather in New Orleans, she met the co-owner of The Daily Picayune, Alva M. Holbrook. He asked her to become literary editor of the newspaper. She accepted the job and in May 1872 married Holbrook, who was divorced and thirty-four years her senior. The marriage was unhappy. In a letter to her first lover she confided that Holbrook "never did, and never will" love her. A month after their marriage, Holbrook's first wife returned from New York and attacked her with a pistol and a bottle of rum. This was followed by a messy and protracted court battle.

Holbrook died in bankruptcy in 1876 owing $80,000, a very large amount of money in those days. He left the newspaper to his young widow, which she continued to run. This was a courageous decision for a woman at that time. She had fallen in love with the business manager of the paper, a married man named George Nicholson. A year after Nicholson's first wife died, he married Rivers in June 1878.

Picayune owner
George Nicholson was a talented businessman who bought a 25% interest in the Daily Picayune and managed to pay down the debt and increase advertising revenue. Rivers introduced many innovations to the Daily Picayune that greatly increased circulation, making the paper one of the leading journals in the South. Among other changes, she added stories on women, sports reporting, children's pages, poetry, and literary stories. She also started a gossip column and hired Dorothy Dix, a pioneer women's advice columnist. In 1881, she hired Martha R. Field as the newspaper's first salaried woman reporter; under a pseudonym, Field wrote the popular "Catherine Cole's Letter" column and also contributed to a second column, "Women's World and Work".

The introduction of a society column on March 16, 1879, the "Society Bee", was controversial. One reader wrote that it was "shabby", "shoddy" and "shameful" to mention the name of any lady in a newspaper. But by 1890 the column had become the largest section in the Sunday edition and was widely imitated.

The visual appearance of the paper evolved. Advertising was moved out of column space and into boxes, which first appeared in June 1882. Before 1885 the paper rarely ran illustrations. By 1887 the pages were full of chalk plate drawings. The rakish and sophisticated Weather Frog appeared in cartoons from 13 January 1894, and the first political cartoon after her death on April 18, 1896. She changed the paper into a family newspaper, and, between 1880 and 1890, the circulation more than tripled while the paper grew in size and influence.

Under Rivers, the paper fought corruption, gave strong opinions on public works on the Mississippi, supported railroad construction, advocated political changes and took other principled stands. But the paper reflected the views of its readers. It was hostile to the Negro Republican Party, publishing editorials in the 1890s in favor of disenfranchising negroes on the basis that they were "unfit to vote, ignorant, shiftless, depraved and criminal-minded", and would be controlled by a "ring" of white politicians. The Picayune reported Negro lynchings casually.

Affiliations
Rivers became the first president of the National Woman's Press Association in 1884, and became the first honorary member of the New York Women's Press Club. In March 1886, the editor of the New York magazine Forest and Stream invited "Mr. E.J. Nicholson" to be vice-president of the Audubon Society. Two weeks later, the editor apologized for assuming Rivers was a man and ranking her with the "inferior sex".

A lover of animals, Rivers wrote editorials criticizing dog fighting and the beating of horses and mules. She was a driving force in launching the New Orleans Society for the Prevention of Cruelty to Animals in 1888.

Personal life and death

Her husband caught influenza and died in New Orleans. Rivers died of the same disease two weeks later, on February 15, 1896, leaving two teenage children.

Literary achievements
Rivers' early rhyming verse was mainly pastoral, with some poetry touching on love and heartbreak and, in retrospect, was not exceptional although it revealed a keen perception of nature. However, Dr. W.H. Holcomb, a scholarly critic at the time wrote of her book Lyrics that "She stands by this volume ahead of any other Southern poet, and no female writer in America, from Mrs. Sigourney to the Carey sisters, has evidenced more poetic genius".

An example of her early poetry, first published anonymously:
Whistling through the corn field,Whistling a merry air,My feet are deep in the pea-vines,And tangles are in my hair.

Old folks say 'tis unluckyFor maidens to whistle; still,Life is a rugged country,And whistling helps uphill.

Talking of her early life in the poem Myself, she introduced the "gossip-loving bee," who gave its name to the Society Bee column:
With windows low and narrow too,Where birds came peeping inTo wake me up at early mornAnd oft I used to win

The Cherokees to climb the sill,The gossip loving bee,To come so near that he would pauseAnd buzz a word to me.

Her later blank verse works "Hagar" and "Leah", published in Cosmopolitan in 1893 and 1894, have more depth, giving a powerful sense of the bitterness and jealousy of her heroines.

Her more important work, however, was in journalism. Through vivid and entertaining prose she gave thoughtful and intelligent commentary on many of the issues of the day. Despite a lack of confidence in her abilities, she was a remarkable and discerning writer.

Selected works

References

Further reading
 * Gilley, B. H. "A Woman for Women: Eliza Nicholson, Publisher of the New Orleans Daily Picayune." Louisiana History 30.3 (1989): 233-248.  online

External links

 
 Nicholson Family Papers at The Historic New Orleans Collection 

1843 births
1896 deaths
Deaths from influenza
Infectious disease deaths in Louisiana
People from Picayune, Mississippi
People from Hancock County, Mississippi
Writers from Mississippi
Poets from Mississippi
American women journalists
Editors of Louisiana newspapers
19th-century American newspaper publishers (people)
19th-century American women writers
Women newspaper editors
Pseudonymous women writers
19th-century American businesswomen
19th-century American businesspeople
Women's page journalists
19th-century American journalists
19th-century pseudonymous writers